Margrace Mill Village Historic District is a national historic district located at Kings Mountain, Cleveland County, North Carolina.  It encompasses 57 contributing buildings in a residential section of Kings Mountain.  The houses date between about 1919 and 1956, and characterized by one-story frame mill houses. All of the principal resources in the district were erected by the Neisler family textile company and housed employees of the nearby Margrace and Patricia mills. Notable nonresidential buildings are the Margrace Mill Clubhouse (c. 1933) and Margrace Mill Company Store.

It was listed on the National Register of Historic Places in 2009.

References

Historic districts on the National Register of Historic Places in North Carolina
Kings Mountain, North Carolina
Buildings and structures in Cleveland County, North Carolina
National Register of Historic Places in Cleveland County, North Carolina